is a railway station in Miyako, Fukuoka Prefecture, Japan. It is on the Tagawa Line, operated by the Heisei Chikuhō Railway. Trains arrive roughly every 30 minutes.

On 1 April 2009, a software development company headquartered in Hachiōji, Tokyo, acquired naming rights to the station.

Gallery

External links
Shin-Toyotsu Station (Heisei Chikuhō Railway website)

References

Railway stations in Fukuoka Prefecture
Railway stations in Japan opened in 1990
Heisei Chikuhō Railway Tagawa Line